The Burrin Burrin Reserve is a privately owned nature reserve located in the upper reaches of the Shoalhaven River catchment in the Southern Tablelands region of southeastern New South Wales, Australia. The reserve is owned and managed by Bush Heritage Australia which purchased the property in 1999.

Features

Landscape and vegetation
Burrin Burrin is situated in rugged country on the escarpment of the Great Dividing Range.  The vegetation varies from tall, wet, eucalypt forest of ribbon gum and brown barrel on the higher ground down to more open forest of silver-top ash and woodlands of brittle gum.

Fauna
Mammal species present on Burrin Burrin include sugar and squirrel gliders as well as brushtail and ringtail possums.  Bird species include the powerful owl and superb lyrebird.

See also

 List of reduplicated Australian place names
 Protected areas of New South Wales

References

External links
 Bush Heritage Australia

Bush Heritage Australia reserves
Nature reserves in New South Wales
1999 establishments in Australia
Southern Tablelands